Direct Currents is the name of several promotional features by DC Comics, including a long-running newsletter.

History
Direct Currents was first used as the name of a text feature appearing in DC's comics beginning in 1966. In the 1970s, the feature appeared in DC's fan magazine The Amazing World of DC Comics. From the late 1970s to the early 1980s, the name was also used for one of the features in DC's Daily Planet house ads.

From November 1976 to July 1977, DC had its own toll-free phone number called the Direct Currents Hot-Line, where fans could hear pre-recorded messages from DC staff about upcoming titles. The phone number was so popular (it was receiving an average of 100,000 calls a week toward its end) that it had to be shut down due to strain on the telephone system.

Beginning in 1978 and lasting a little more than a year, Direct Currents was the name for a one-page newsletter. The newsletter, which was available by subscription, featured a 13" by 18" poster cover.

In 1988, Direct Currents became the title of a free monthly newsletter distributed by comic book stores, containing articles about DC Comics titles being released that month as well as a checklist of the month's new releases. It was a replacement for DC's previous newsletter, DC Releases. Unlike DC Releases, which was printed in black and white and magazine-sized, Direct Currents was printed in color and was the size of a regular comic book. Eventually, Direct Currents contained a flipbook format, with one side containing features about DC Universe titles, and the other containing features about titles from DC's Vertigo and Paradox Press imprints. The newsletter ran for a total of 92 issues, ending in 1995, and also produced two specials.

Beginning in November 2016, the name was used for a free quarterly magazine offering sneak peeks of every DC title. However, the book was cancelled after only one issue.

List of Direct Currents issues

1988-1997
{|class="wikitable plainrowheaders" style="text-align: center" width="60%"
!width=10%|Issue Number
!width=20%|Date
!width=35%|Cover Story
!width=35%|Notes
|-
!scope="row"|1
|February 9 - March 8, 1988
|Flash Gordon maxi-series
|
|-
!scope="row"|2
|March 15 - April 5, 1988
|Action Comics Weekly ongoing series; Superman vol. 2 ongoing series becomes twice-monthly
|
|-
!scope="row"|3
|April 12 - May 10, 1988
|Power of the Atom ongoing series
|
|-
!scope="row"|4
|May 17-31, 1988
|V for Vendetta maxi-series
|
|-
!scope="row"|5
|June 7-28, 1988
|Hawk and Dove vol. 2 mini-series
|
|-
!scope="row"|6
|July 5-26, 1988
|Cosmic Odyssey mini-series
|
|-
!scope="row"|7
|August 2-30, 1988
|The Prisoner mini-series
|
|-
!scope="row"|8
|September 6-27, 1988
|Plastic Man vol. 2 mini-series
|
|-
!scope="row"|9
|October 4-25, 1988
|Invasion! mini-series
|
|-
!scope="row"|10
|November 1-29, 1988
|Black Orchid mini-series
|
|-
!scope="row"|11
|December 6-20, 1988
|The Greatest Joker Stories Ever Told hardcover
|
|-
!scope="row"|12
|January 3-31, 1989
|The Huntress ongoing series
|
|-
!scope="row"|13
|February 1989
|Justice League Europe ongoing series
|
|-
!scope="row"|14
|March 1989
|"The Janus Directive" crossover
|
|-
!scope="row"|15
|April 1989
|Skreemer mini-series
|
|-
!scope="row"|16
|May 1989
|Lex Luthor: The Unauthorized Biography one-shot
|
|-
!scope="row"|17
|June 1989
|The Batman Movie Adaptation one-shot
|
|-
!scope="row"|18
|July 1989
|Justice, Inc. vol. 2 mini-series
|
|-
!scope="row"|19
|August 1989
|The Shadow Strikes! ongoing series
|
|-
!scope="row"|20
|September 1989
|The Legion of Super-Heroes vol. 4 ongoing series; The Legion of Super-Heroes: The Great Darkness Saga trade paperback
|
|-
!scope="row"|21
|October 1989
|Arkham Asylum: A Serious House on Serious Earth graphic novel
|
|-
!scope="row"|22
|November 1989
|Deadman: Love after Death mini-series
|
|-
!scope="row"|23
|December 1989
|The Greatest Golden Age Stories Ever Told hardcover
|
|-
!scope="row"|24
|January 1990
|Adam Strange mini-series
|
|-
!scope="row"|25
|February 1990
|Batman: Digital Justice graphic novel
|
|-
!scope="row"|26
|March 1990
|The Butcher mini-series
|
|-
!scope="row"|27
|April 1990
|Hawkworld vol. 2 ongoing series
|
|-
!scope="row"|28
|May 1990
|The Demon vol. 3 ongoing series
|
|-
!scope="row"|29
|June 1990
|World's Finest mini-series
|
|-
!scope="row"|30
|July 1990
|Enemy Ace: War Idyll graphic novel
|
|-
!scope="row"|31
|August 1990
|The Doom Patrol vol. 2 #37 (Rhea Jones awakes from her coma)
|
|-
!scope="row"|32
|September 1990
|Twilight mini-series
|
|-
!scope="row"|33
|October 1990
|Batman 3D graphic novel
|
|-
!scope="row" rowspan="2"|34
|rowspan="2"|November 1990
|The Books of Magic mini-series
|rowspan="2"|Flip book
|-
|Robin mini-series
|-
!scope="row"|35
|December 1990
|The Greatest Flash Stories Ever Told hardcover
|
|-
!scope="row"|36
|January 1991
|Angel and the Ape vol. 2 mini-series
|
|-
!scope="row"|37
|February 1991
|Kid Eternity mini-series
|
|-
!scope="row"|38
|March 1991
|Armageddon 2001 mini-series and crossover
|
|-
!scope="row"|39
|April 1991
|Star Trek'''s 25th anniversary (Star Trek: The Mirror Universe Saga trade paperback)
|
|-
!scope="row"|40
|May 1991
|Impact Comics line debuts (The Legend of the Shield ongoing series)
|Includes 16-page Impact Comics preview
|-
!scope="row"|41
|June 1991
|Impact Comics line continues (The Comet and The Jaguar ongoing series)
|
|-
!scope="row" rowspan="2"|42/43
|July 1991
|War of the Gods mini-series and crossover
|rowspan="2"|Double issue flip book
|-
|August 1991
|The Psycho mini-series
|-
!scope="row"|44
|September 1991
|Sandman-related releases
|
|-
!scope="row"|45
|October 1991
|Robin II: The Joker's Wild mini-series
|
|-
!scope="row"|46
|November 1991
|The Lobo Paramilitary Christmas Special one-shot
|
|-
!scope="row"|47
|December 1991
|Batman Versus Predator mini-series, Batman: Master of the Future one-shot, Batman: Blind Justice trade paperback, and DC Comics hologram buttons
|
|-
!scope="row"|48
|January 1992
|Batman: Gotham Nights mini-series
|
|-
!scope="row"|49
|February 1992
|New creative teams on Justice League America and Justice League Europe, Justice League Spectacular one-shot, and other Justice League-related releases
|
|-
!scope="row"|50
|May 1992
|Lobo's Back mini-series
|
|-
!scope="row"|51
|June 1992
|Green Lantern vol. 3 #25 (Hal Jordan versus Guy Gardner), Green Lantern Corps Quarterly and Green Lantern: Mosaic ongoing series, and other Green Lantern-related releases
|
|-
!scope="row"|52
|July 1992
|Batman: Shadow of the Bat ongoing series and other Batman-related releases
|
|-
!scope="row"|53
|August 1992
|Batman Returns Movie Adaptation one-shot
|
|-
!scope="row"|54
|September 1992
|Team Titans ongoing series
|
|-
!scope="row"|55
|October 1992
|Batman: Sword of Azrael mini-series
|
|-
!scope="row"|56
|November 1992
|Green Lantern: Ganthet's Tale one-shot
|
|-
!scope="row"|57
|December 1992
|Robin III: Cry of the Huntress mini-series
|
|-
!scope="row"|58
|January 1993
|Superman vol. 2 #75 ("The Death of Superman")
|
|-
!scope="row"|59
|February 1993
|Batman: Seduction of the Gun one-shot
|
|-
!scope="row" rowspan="2"|60
|rowspan="2"|March 1993
|The Legacy of Superman one-shot
|rowspan="2"|First DC/Vertigo flip book
|-
|Vertigo imprint launches
|-
!scope="row" rowspan="2"|61
|rowspan="2"|April 1993
|Milestone Media debuts (Hardware and Blood Syndicate ongoing series)
|rowspan="2"|
|-
|Sandman Mystery Theatre ongoing series
|-
!scope="row" rowspan="2"|62
|rowspan="2"|May 1993
|The Atom Special one-shot
|rowspan="2"|
|-
|Kid Eternity vol. 2 ongoing series
|-
!scope="row" rowspan="2"|63
|rowspan="2"|June 1993
|Adventures of Superman #500 (Superman returns from the dead) and the "Reign of the Supermen!" storyline
|rowspan="2"|
|-
|The Sandman vol. 2 #50 (anniversary issue)
|-
!scope="row" rowspan="2"|64
|rowspan="2"|July 1993
|"Bloodlines" crossover
|rowspan="2"|
|-
|Skin Graft: The Adventures of a Tattooed Man mini-series
|-
!scope="row" rowspan="2"|65
|rowspan="2"|August 1993
|Catwoman vol. 2 ongoing series
|rowspan="2"|
|-
|Jonah Hex: Two-Gun Mojo mini-series
|-
!scope="row" rowspan="2"|66
|rowspan="2"|September 1993
|Hawkman vol. 3 ongoing series
|rowspan="2"|
|-
|Vertigo's "Second Wave" (Vertigo-related releases and improvements to existing titles)
|-
!scope="row" rowspan="2"|67
|rowspan="2"|October 1993
|Batman #500 (conclusion of the "Knightfall" storyline)
|rowspan="2"|
|-
|Hellblazer Special one-shot
|-
!scope="row" rowspan="2"|68
|rowspan="2"|November 1993
|Robin vol. 2 ongoing series, plus the Robin: Tragedy and Triumph trade paperback
|rowspan="2"|
|-
|The Sandman: Fables & Reflections hardcover
|-
!scope="row" rowspan="2"|69
|rowspan="2"|December 1993
|Lobo vol. 2 ongoing series, plus the Lobo standup and Lobo: Smokin'! poster
|rowspan="2"|
|-
|"The Children's Crusade" crossover
|-
!scope="row" rowspan="2"|70
|rowspan="2"|January 1994
|"Shadow War" crossover
|rowspan="2"|
|-
|Death: The High Cost of Living hardcover, Death Gallery one-shot, Death T-shirt, and Death watch
|-
!scope="row" rowspan="2"|71
|rowspan="2"|February 1994
|Superboy vol. 3 and Steel ongoing series, Supergirl vol. 3 and Legends of the World's Finest mini-series, and other Superman-related releases
|rowspan="2"|
|-
|The Sandman vol. 2 #57 (beginning of "The Kindly Ones" storyline) and The Sandman: Fables & Reflections trade paperback
|-
!scope="row" rowspan="2"|72
|rowspan="2"|March 1994
|The Power of Shazam! graphic novel
|rowspan="2"|
|-
|Swamp Thing vol. 2 #140 (writing team of Grant Morrison and Mark Millar begins)
|-
!scope="row" rowspan="2"|73
|rowspan="2"|April 1994
|Green Lantern vol. 3 #51 (Kyle Rayner becomes Green Lantern)
|rowspan="2"|
|-
|The Mystery Play graphic novel
|-
!scope="row" rowspan="2"|74
|rowspan="2"|May 1994
|Batman/Spawn: War Devil one-shot
|rowspan="2"|
|-
|The Books of Magic vol. 2 ongoing series
|-
!scope="row" rowspan="2"|75
|rowspan="2"|June 1994
|Superman/Doomsday: Hunter/Prey mini-series
|rowspan="2"|
|-
|Witchcraft mini-series
|-
!scope="row" rowspan="2"|76
|rowspan="2"|July 1994
|"Worlds Collide" crossover
|rowspan="2"|
|-
|The Heart of the Beast graphic novel
|-
!scope="row" rowspan="2"|77
|rowspan="2"|August 1994
|"KnightsEnd" storyline
|rowspan="2"|
|-
|Vamps mini-series
|-
!scope="row" rowspan="2"|78
|rowspan="2"|September 1994
|Zero Hour: Crisis in Time mini-series and crossover
|rowspan="2"|
|-
|The Invisibles ongoing series
|-
!scope="row" rowspan="2"|79
|rowspan="2"|October 1994
|Zero Month (every DC title gets a #0 issue)
|rowspan="2"|
|-
|The Sandman: A Gallery of Dreams one-shot
|-
!scope="row" rowspan="2"|80
|rowspan="2"|November 1994
|Starman vol. 2 ongoing series
|rowspan="2"|
|-
|Shadows Fall mini-series
|-
!scope="row" rowspan="2"|81
|rowspan="2"|December 1994
|Batman Versus Predator II: Bloodmatch mini-series
|rowspan="2"|
|-
|The Tragical Comedy or Comical Tragedy of Mr. Punch graphic novel
|-
!scope="row" rowspan="2"|82
|rowspan="2"|January 1995
|Batman: Bloodstorm graphic novel
|rowspan="2"|
|-
|Paradox Press imprint launches
|-
!scope="row" rowspan="2"|83
|rowspan="2"|February 1995
|Azrael ongoing series
|rowspan="2"|
|-
|Tainted one-shot
|-
!scope="row" rowspan="2"|84
|rowspan="2"|March 1995
|The Power of Shazam! ongoing series
|rowspan="2"|
|-
|Jonah Hex: Riders of the Worm and Such mini-series
|-
!scope="row" rowspan="2"|85
|rowspan="2"|April 1995
|Flash vol. 2 #100 (anniversary issue)
|rowspan="2"|
|-
|Preacher ongoing series
|-
!scope="row" rowspan="2"|86
|rowspan="2"|May 1995
|Superman vol. 2 #100 ("The Death of Clark Kent" storyline)
|rowspan="2"|
|-
|Tank Girl Movie Adaptation one-shot
|-
!scope="row"|Special 1
|1995
|
|
|-
!scope="row" rowspan="2"|87
|rowspan="2"|June 1995
|Justice League America #100 (anniversary issue)
|rowspan="2"|
|-
|Tank Girl: The Odyssey mini-series
|-
!scope="row" rowspan="2"|88
|rowspan="2"|July 1995
|Sovereign Seven ongoing series
|rowspan="2"|
|-
|Chiaroscuro: The Private Lives of Leonardo da Vinci maxi-series
|-
!scope="row" rowspan="2"|89
|rowspan="2"|August 1995
|Batman Forever Movie Adaptation one-shot and other Batman-related releases
|rowspan="2"|
|-
|The Sandman vol. 2 #70 ("The Wake" storyline)
|-
!scope="row" rowspan="2"|90
|rowspan="2"|September 1995
|Wonder Woman vol. 2 #101 (John Byrne takes over as writer/artist)
|rowspan="2"|
|-
|Sandman Midnight Theatre one-shot
|-
!scope="row" rowspan="2"|91
|rowspan="2"|October 1995
|Batman: Man-Bat mini-series
|rowspan="2"|
|-
|Stuck Rubber Baby graphic novel
|-
!scope="row" rowspan="2"|92
|rowspan="2"|November 1995
|Underworld Unleashed mini-series and crossover
|rowspan="2"|
|-
|The Tragical Comedy or Comical Tragedy of Mr. Punch softcover
|-
!scope="row"|1997 Special
|1997
|
|
|}

2016

See also
 Comic Shop News Marvel Age''

Notes

References

DC Comics titles
1988 comics debuts